Lucas Torró, a Spanish footballer
 María Teresa Torró Flor, a Spanish professional tennis player

See also 

 TORRO, a tornado and storm research organisation